
Fauve or Fauves may refer to:

Fauvism, an art movement, or

Music
 Fauve (collective), French arts collective of music and videography
 The Fauves, an Australian rock band
 The Fauves (album)
 Fauve (musician), stage name of Swiss musician and singer Nicolas Julliard (born 1972)

People
 Stephan Fauve (born 1955), French physicist
 Fauve Hautot (born 1986), French dancer and choreographer
 Fauve, name formerly used by comics artist and writer Holly Golightly

Other uses
 Fauve (dog), a short legged hunting breed of dog
 Central African Republic national football team, nicknamed "Les Fauves"
 Fauve Software, a defunct company
 Fauve (film), a 2018 short film

See also
 Fauvism, a style of painting
 Favre (disambiguation)